Article 13.3 of the Organic Law of Gagauzia describes the coat of arms of Gagauzia as follows:-

The coat of arms represents an image of heraldic shield, on the lower part of
which there is a yellow (golden) hemisphere of rising sun on blue background. The shield
is framed by yellow (golden) spikes enlaced by the flag of Gagauzia. Under the shield there
is a conventional image of vine-leaves and vine-bunches. Three five-pointed yellow (golden)
stars are arranged in form of an equilateral triangle above the shield.

See also
 Flag of Gagauzia

References

Gagauzia
Gagauzia